Governor Bradford may refer to:

Augustus Bradford (1806–1881), 32nd Governor of Maryland
Robert F. Bradford (1902–1983), 57th Governor of Massachusetts
William Bradford (governor) (1590–1657), 2nd, 5th, 7th, 9th & 12th Governor of Plymouth Colony